Task Force 91 was a United States Navy task force.

On 1 May 1945, it consisted of Alaskan Sea Frontier Forces (established on 15 April 1944) under Rear Admiral R. F. Wood USA, part of North Pacific Force under Vice Admiral Frank Fletcher.

References

United States Navy task forces
United States Navy units and formations in the Korean War